Salford City Radio is a community radio station based in Salford, Greater Manchester. It launched in September 2007 after securing a five-year FM licence to broadcast full-time on 94.4 MHz. The station broadcasts a mixture of community news, music and talk shows from its base at Salford Civic Centre in Swinton. In 2017 its licence was renewed until 2022.

References

External links
Salford City Radio

Mass media in Salford
Radio stations in Manchester
Community radio stations in the United Kingdom